Lek Nana (1924–1 April 2010) was a Thai businessman and politician. He was one of the founders of Thailand's Democrat Party at the end of World War II. Lek Nana served as Deputy Foreign Minister as well as Minister of Science, Technology, and Energy. A Muslim of Gujarati ancestry, he was a senior member of the Central Islamic Committee of Thailand. The Nana area on Sukhumvit Road derives its name from him.

Career
Nana became Deputy Foreign Minister in 1975 under Prime Minister Seni Pramoj, losing his office in the military coup that followed the October 1976 massacre of leftist protesters at Thammasat University.

He served as an honorary consul-general for Iraq in Thailand until 1981. In December 1982, a powerful bomb exploded in his office building in Bangkok's Chinatown, killing a police bomb disposal expert, injuring 20 other people, and causing a fire that damaged five buildings. Nana was not in the office at the time. His office had formerly been the Iraqi consulate, and a connection to the Iran–Iraq War was suspected to have been the reason.

In 1982 Nana became secretary general of the Democrat Party under party leader Bhichai Rattakul. He also served on the party's executive board repeatedly.

In 1985, Prime Minister Prem Tinsulanonda appointed Nana as Minister for Science and Technology, following the suicide of the previous minister, Damrong Latthapipat, said to have been displeased by the inadequate funding he had received.

Legacy
Nana was nicknamed the "landlord of Bangkok" and owned a great deal of property along Bangkok's Sukhumvit Road, especially in the area  now known as "Soi Nana" (Sukhumvit Soi 3 and Sukhumvit Soi 4). The name Nana is also used for the nearby Skytrain station, the Nana Hotel and the Nana Plaza entertainment complex.

A philanthropist, Nana donated land for the headquarters of the Democrat Party, for the Princess Mother Memorial Park, and for a hospital.

Death
Lek Nana died of a heart attack in a Bangkok hospital in 2010 at the age of 85. He was buried at Ban Somdej Mosque in Thonburi, with royal representation from HM King Bhumibol Adulyadej.

References

Bibliography
 Dubey, Tung Nath, India and Thailand: A Brief History, H.K. Publishers and Distributors, 1990

1924 births
Lek Nana
2010 deaths
Lek Nana
Lek Nana
Lek Nana
Lek Nana
Lek Nana
Lek Nana
Deaths from heart disease